Thongchai Rathchai (born October 31, 1982), nicknamed Thong, is a retired professional footballer who played as a forward from Roi Et Province, Thailand.

Clubs

Senior

Honors

Roi Et United
 Regional League Division 2: 2013
 Regional League North-East Division: 2011, 2012, 2013

Ubon UMT United
 Regional League Division 2: 2015
 Regional League North-East Division runner-up: 2015

References

1982 births
Living people
Thongchai Rathchai
Thongchai Rathchai
Association football forwards
Thongchai Rathchai
Thongchai Rathchai
Thongchai Rathchai
Thongchai Rathchai
Thongchai Rathchai
Thongchai Rathchai
Thai expatriate footballers